Ashley McIntosh (born 20 October 1972) is a former Australian rules footballer who played for the Claremont Football Club in the West Australian Football League (WAFL) and the West Coast Eagles in the Australian Football League (AFL).

Early life
McIntosh attended Scotch College in Swanbourne, playing football for his school and the Dalkeith-Nedlands Junior Football Club. He also represented Scotch College in athletics, winning the state hurdles events over 200m and 400m.

Playing style
While capable at either end of the ground, McIntosh most famous for playing at full back, and in 2006 was named as the full-back in the club's best team ever over its 20-year existence (since 1987). He won a club best and fairest in 1998, and has been an All-Australian.

McIntosh was a very athletic player, and it was often reported that he could run a 100 m race in 11.0 seconds. The wiry McIntosh was also deceptively strong.  Wayne Carey, on Talking Footy, once credited him as the strongest opponent he'd ever played against, which surprised a lot of people, including the show's host Bruce McAvaney.

He was well known for his battles with Wayne Carey. Fittingly, his final game was played against the Adelaide Crows, who Carey had signed with prior to the 2003 season. Continuing their war against each other, albeit older and slower, Carey regained vintage form and destroyed McIntosh head to head. In what would be McIntosh's final possession, he shanked a kick out of bound on the full after being laid out by Carey. Mercifully, McIntosh announced his immediate retirement following the game.

Statistics

|-
|- style="background-color: #EAEAEA"
! scope="row" style="text-align:center" | 1991
|style="text-align:center;"|
| 53 || 17 || 11 || 6 || 102 || 52 || 154 || 58 || 8 || 0.6 || 0.4 || 6.0 || 3.1 || 9.1 || 3.4 || 0.5 || 2
|-
|style="text-align:center;background:#afe6ba;"|1992†
|style="text-align:center;"|
| 11 || 17 || 15|| 9 || 104 || 63 || 167 || 48 || 21 || 0.9 || 0.5 || 6.1 || 3.7 || 9.8 || 2.8 || 1.2 || 5
|- style="background-color: #EAEAEA"
! scope="row" style="text-align:center" | 1993
|style="text-align:center;"|
| 11 || 19 || 25 || 11 || 147 || 61 || 208 || 68 || 29 || 1.3 || 0.6 || 7.7 || 3.2 || 10.9 || 3.6 || 1.5 || 5
|-
|style="text-align:center;background:#afe6ba;"|1994†
|style="text-align:center;"|
| 11 || 24 || 22 || 17 || 204 || 97 || 301 || 107 || 25 || 0.9 || 0.7 || 8.5 || 4.0 || 12.5 || 4.5 || 1.0 || 11
|- style="background-color: #EAEAEA"
! scope="row" style="text-align:center" | 1995
|style="text-align:center;"|
| 11 || 10 || 12 || 4 || 54 || 39 || 93 || 34 || 6 || 1.2 || 0.4 || 5.4 || 3.9 || 9.3 || 3.4 || 0.6 || 0
|-
! scope="row" style="text-align:center" | 1996
|style="text-align:center;"|
| 11 || 24 || 1 || 2 || 129 || 111 || 240 || 81 || 23 || 0.0 || 0.1 || 5.4 || 4.6 || 10.0 || 3.4 || 1.0 || 2
|- style="background-color: #EAEAEA"
! scope="row" style="text-align:center" | 1997
|style="text-align:center;"|
| 11 || 19 || 5 || 2 || 112 || 65 || 177 || 55 || 13 || 0.3 || 0.1 || 5.9 || 3.4 || 9.3 || 2.9 || 0.7 || 0
|-
! scope="row" style="text-align:center" | 1998
|style="text-align:center;"|
| 11 || 23 || 2 || 3 || 203 || 95 || 298 || 90 || 36 || 0.1 || 0.1 || 8.8 || 4.1 || 13.0 || 3.9 || 1.6 || 6
|- style="background-color: #EAEAEA"
! scope="row" style="text-align:center" | 1999
|style="text-align:center;"|
| 11 || 22 || 0 || 1 || 158 || 76 || 234 || 88 || 16 || 0.0 || 0.0 || 7.2 || 3.5 || 10.6 || 4.0 || 0.7 || 0
|-
! scope="row" style="text-align:center" | 2000
|style="text-align:center;"|
| 11 || 22 || 9 || 7 || 135 || 68 || 203 || 69 || 24 || 0.4 || 0.3 || 6.1 || 3.1 || 9.2 || 3.1 || 1.1 || 0
|- style="background-color: #EAEAEA"
! scope="row" style="text-align:center" | 2001
|style="text-align:center;"|
| 11 || 12 || 6 || 4 || 78 || 28 || 106 || 50 || 10 || 0.5 || 0.3 || 6.5 || 2.3 || 8.8 || 4.2 || 0.8 || 0
|-
! scope="row" style="text-align:center" | 2002
|style="text-align:center;"|
| 11 || 19 || 0 || 0 || 97 || 61 || 158 || 48 || 18 || 0.0 || 0.0 || 5.1 || 3.2 || 18.3 || 2.5 || 0.9 || 1
|- style="background-color: #EAEAEA"
! scope="row" style="text-align:center" | 2003
|style="text-align:center;"|
| 11 || 14 || 0 || 0 || 69 || 48 || 117 || 25 || 14 || 0.0 || 0.0 || 4.9 || 3.4 || 8.4 || 1.8 || 1.0 || 0
|- class="sortbottom"
! colspan=3| Career
! 242
! 108
! 66
! 1592
! 864
! 2456
! 821
! 243
! 0.4
! 0.3
! 6.6
! 3.6
! 10.1
! 3.4
! 1.0
! 32
|}

References

External links

1972 births
Living people
All-Australians (AFL)
Australian rules footballers from Western Australia
Claremont Football Club players
John Worsfold Medal winners
West Coast Eagles players
West Coast Eagles Premiership players
West Australian Football Hall of Fame inductees
Edith Cowan University alumni
People educated at Scotch College, Perth
Western Australian State of Origin players
Two-time VFL/AFL Premiership players